Google juice may refer to

 A colloquial name for the value afforded to incoming web links by PageRank, the Google search algorithm
 Google Guice, an open source software framework for the Java platform